The 2004 ATS Formel 3 Cup was a multi-event motor racing championship for single-seat open wheel formula racing cars that held across Europe. The championship featured drivers competing in two-litre Formula Three racing cars built by Dallara which conform to the technical regulations, or formula, for the championship.  It was the second edition of the ATS F3 Cup. It commenced on 24 April at Hockenheim and ended on 9 October at Oschersleben after nine double-header rounds.

HS Technik Motorsport driver Bastian Kolmsee clinched both championship and rookie title. He achieved four wins, to overcome his closest rival Timo Lienemann by nine points, who won two races. The third place went to Jan Heylen, who started his season at Lausitz and won six races. His JB Motorsport teammate Michael Devaney won races at Oschersleben and Assen. Thomas Holzer, who completed the top-five, lost 54 points to Devaney in the main standings. Other wins were shared between opening round winner Jan Seyffarth and Jochen Nerpel.

Teams and drivers
All cars were powered by Opel engines, excepting Seyffarth Motorsport cars that were powered by Renault. All drivers competed in Dallara chassis; model listed.

Race calendar and results
With the exception of round at TT Circuit Assen, all rounds took place on German soil.

Championship standings

Cup
Points were awarded as follows:

Rookie
Points were awarded as follows:

References

External links
 

German Formula Three Championship seasons
Formula Three season
German
German Formula 3 Championship